Fowle House may refer to:

Fowle-Reed-Wyman House, Arlington, Massachusetts
Edmund Fowle House, Watertown, Massachusetts
Bayne–Fowle House, Alexandria, Virginia